Banco Itaú S.A. was a former Brazilian bank that merged with Unibanco on November 4, 2008, to form Banco Itaú Unibanco.

History
Banco Itaú began in 1945 under the name Banco Central de Crédito (Central Bank of Credit) and later changed its name to Banco Federal de Crédito (Federal Bank of Credit). In 1964, Banco Federal Itaú S.A. merged Banco Federal de Crédito and Banco Itaú, a rural bank belonging to a group originated in Itaú de Minas, in Minas Gerais state. Later that decade, Banco Itaú acquired Banco Sul Americano (1966) and Banco da América (1969).

In 2020, due to improper charges between 2008 and 2018, Itaú signed an agreement with the Central Bank of Brazil committing itself to returning 75.6 million Reais to its customers.

In the 1970s, it merged with Banco Aliança in Rio de Janeiro (1973), Banco Português do Brasil (1974), and Banco União Comercial (1974). In 1979, it opened its first operations abroad with a representative office in New York City and a subsidiary in Buenos Aires.

In the 1980s, it acquired only one small bank, Banco Pinto de Magalhães (1985). Still, this enabled it to continue growing while other Brazilian banks were getting smaller. In 1984, it converted its representative office in New York to a branch.

In the 1990s, it acquired BFB (Banco Francês e Brasileiro) (1995) from Credit Lyonnais, and also several privatized former state banks:

1997: Banerj (Rio de Janeiro)
1998: BEMGE (Minas Gerais)
2000: Banestado (Paraná)
2001: BEG (Goiás)

During the 1990s, Banco Itaú invested heavily in automation, including ATMs and machines installed on customers' premises. At the same time, it cut its staff by more than 50%.

In 1994, it expanded its international operations by founding Banco Itaú Europa, Banco Itaú Argentina, and Itaú Bank (Cayman). In 1997, it acquired Bamerindus Luxembourg, which is now Banco Itaú Europa Luxembourg. When it acquired Banco del Buen Ayre in Argentina in 1998, it subsequently incorporated it into Banco Itaú Argentina, now known as Banco Itaú Buen Ayre.

Banco Itaú has also established a number of alliances. In 1996, it and Bankers Trust, New York, created Itaú Bankers Trust Banco de Investimento, the present Itauvest Banco de Investimento. Banco Itaú also has an important stake in Banco BPI, one of Portugal's largest banks.  In 2002, Banco Itaú joined with Banco BBA-Creditanstalt S.A. (BBA) to create, in 2003, Banco Itaú-BBA, the largest wholesale bank in Brazil.

In the 2000s (decade), it continued to acquire banks. In 2002, it acquired Banco Fiat, together with all of Fiat's auto financing activities. In 2004, it opened a branch in Tokyo.

Then, in April 2006, Banco Itaú purchased the Brazilian operations of BankBoston, a subsidiary that Bank of America acquired with its purchase of FleetBoston. This increased Banco Itaú's clients by 300,000 and assets by R$22 billion. In return, Bank of America took about a 6% stake in Banco Itaú. BankBoston do Brazil had been founded in 1947. With the purchase, the BankBoston name disappeared from Brazil as Bank of America retained the rights to the name. Banco Itaú also received exclusive rights to purchase BankBoston's operations in Chile and Uruguay. In late 2006, it exercised these rights, and in late 2006 and early 2007, it received the necessary regulatory approvals. These two operations became Banco Itaú Chile and Banco Itaú Uruguay.

On November 2, 2008, Banco Itaú and the third largest Brazilian private banking group, Unibanco, announced their intention to merge. In late February 2009, the Central Bank of Brazil approved the merger.

References

External links 

 Banco Itaú Holding Financeira S.A. International Website (in English) (in Spanish) (in Portuguese)

Banks established in 1945
Itaú Unibanco
Itaúsa
Banks disestablished in 2008
Itau

bpy:ইটাউ